Biesheuvel is a surname. Notable people with the surname include:

Barend Biesheuvel (1920–2001), Dutch politician
Maarten Biesheuvel (1939–2020), Dutch writer
Simon Biesheuvel (1908–1991), Dutch-born South African psychologist

Dutch-language surnames